Saint Fortunatus of Spoleto (died ) was a parish priest near Spoleto in Umbria sometime between the 4th and 5th centuries. He is venerated as a saint within the Catholic Church.
 
Little historical detail regarding Fortunatus survives, but he may have been a native of Montefalco, a hill town near Spoleto in Umbria. He became noted after his death for his charity and love for the poor.  A legend told of him states that one day, while plowing a field, Fortunatus found two coins of apparently little value.  He placed them in his pocket.  That evening, upon meeting a poor man upon the road, Fortunatus decided to give the man the two coins.  The sunlight suddenly illuminated the two coins, making them shine like gold.  Not wishing to be tempted by avarice, Fortunatus quickly gave the small treasure to the poor man and hurried away.

After his death, Fortunatus became the focus of a local cult, and the Convent of San Fortunato near Montefalco was dedicated to him.

References

External links
 Booklet on the Life of San Fortunato of Montefalco (also of Spoleto) 1954
 San Fortunato di Spoleto
Commons: Convento di San Fortunato with frescoes by Gozzoli

Saints from Roman Italy
400 deaths
People from the Province of Perugia
4th-century Christian saints
5th-century Christian saints
People from Spoleto
Year of birth unknown